Duncan Green may refer to:

 Duncan Green (aid expert), British aid expert for Oxfam
 Duncan Green (British Army officer) (1925–2019), officer of the British and Indian armies
 Duncan Green (priest) (born 1952), British Anglican priest